ASTRA was a type of nuclear research reactor built in Seibersdorf, Austria near Vienna, at the site of the former Austrian Reactor Center Seibersdorf which now forms part of the Austrian Institute of Technology (AIT).  The acronym stands for Adaptierter Schwimmbecken-Typ-Reaktor Austria (Adapted swimming pool-type reactor Austria).  ASTRA operated from 1960 to 1999.

Timeline

Research 
One of the most advanced experiments in physics carried out at the ASTRA reactor was an experiment on the decay of free neutrons. In this experiment, the electron-neutrino angular correlation in free neutron decay was measured via the shape of the energy spectrum of the recoil protons; the center of a highly evacuated tangential beam tube of the reactor served as neutron source.

The aim was to determine the ratio of the two coupling constants gA and gV of the weak interaction from the shape of the recoil proton spectrum. This spectrum was measured using an electrostatic spectrometer; the protons were counted using an ion electron converter of the coincidence type.

The result was |gA/gV| = 1.259 ± 0.017. This is in good agreement with the later  (much more accurate) average gA/gV = - 1.2695 ± 0.0029; this value was measured using polarised neutrons and hence contains also the sign of the ratio.

Literature 
  R. Dobrozemsky: Production of a Clean Neutron Gas for Decay and Scattering Experiments. In: Nuclear Instruments and Methods. 118 (1974) 1–37.

References

External links
Announcement of planned shutdown from ARC
Planning for the Decommissioning of the ASTRA-Reactor, an IRPA paper from ARC (PDF)
2001 European Commission legal opinion concerning the disposal of nuclear waste from decommissioning ASTRA

Nuclear research reactors
Science and technology in Austria
Nuclear technology in Austria